Giulio Paradisi (born 21 March 1934) is an Italian film director, actor and screenwriter.

Life and career 
Born in Rome, Paradisi enrolled the Centro Sperimentale di Cinematografia and immediately after the graduation he made his acting debut with a small role in Alessandro Blasetti's Too Bad She's Bad. 

After playing several other character roles with notable directors including Federico Fellini and Francesco Maselli, he began working as an assistant director in 1963, later directing a few fairly successful films on his own between 1970 and 1982.  Paradisi was also active as a stage director and as a director of commercials.

Filmography

Director 
Terzo Canale - Avventura a Montecarlo (1970) 
Ragazzo di borgata (1976)
The Visitor (1979)  
Tesoromio (1979) 
Spaghetti House (1982)

References

External links 
 

1934 births
Italian screenwriters
Italian male screenwriters
Writers from Rome
Film directors from Rome
Italian male film actors
Centro Sperimentale di Cinematografia alumni
Living people